The 2001 Macau Grand Prix (officially the 48th Macau Grand Prix) was a motor race for Formula Three (F3) cars that was held on the streets of Macau on 18 November 2001. Unlike other races, such as the Masters of Formula 3, the 2001 Macau Grand Prix was not a part of any F3 championship, but was open to entries from all F3 championships. The race was divided into two 15-lpa aggregate legs lasting held in the morning and the afternoon, with overall winner being the driver who completed all 30 laps in the shortest possible time. The 2001 edition was the 48th running of the Macau Grand Prix and the 19th for F3 cars.

The Grand Prix was won by Carlin Motorsport driver Takuma Sato, having begun the first leg from second place. Sato overtook pole position starter Björn Wirdheim of Prema Powerteam at the start of the first leg and he pulled way to win to start the second from first. He led every lap of the second leg to claim victory in his second appearance in Macau and he was the first Japanese driver in history to win the Macau Grand Prix outright. Second place went to Mugen x Dome Project's Benoît Tréluyer and Wirdheim completed the overall podium in third place.

Background and entry list
The Macau Grand Prix is a Formula Three (F3) race considered to be a stepping stone to higher motor racing categories such as Formula One and has been termed the territory's most prestigious international sporting event. The 2001 Macau Grand Prix was the 48th edition of the event and the 19th time it was held to F3 regulations. It took place on the  22-turn Guia Circuit on 18 November 2001 with three preceding days of practice and qualifying. Following an accident in which driver Frans Verschuur's brakes failed, which meant he penetrated the Lisboa corner tyre wall, and ploughed into a truck, killing a mainland Chinese tourist and injuring three other people during the warm-up session for the 2000 Guia Race of Macau, race organisers installed two rows of steel barriers and enhanced safety by replacing its canvas and repaired the area's asphalt road surface.

In order to compete in Macau, drivers had to compete in a Fédération Internationale de l'Automobile (FIA)-regulated championship race during the calendar year, in one of the seven national F3 championships that took place during the calendar year, with the highest-placed drivers given priority in receiving an invitation to the race. Within the 30 car grid of the event, each of the major F3 series were represented by their respective champions. British champion Takuma Sato, who had been signed to drive for Jordan Grand Prix in the 2002 Formula One World Championship in October 2001 and was the first contracted Formula One driver to compete at the Macau Grand Prix since the 1985 race, was joined in Macau by German title holder Toshihiro Kaneishi, French series champion Ryō Fukuda, Japanese series winner Benoît Tréluyer and Australian champion Peter Hackett. Three Macanese drivers were issued invitations from the Macau Grand Prix Committee to participate in the event: Jo Merszei, Michael Ho and Lei Kit Meng. British series driver Gianmaria Bruni elected to withdraw from the event and the Korea Super Prix because of a lack of car familiarisation time and he opted to test an International Formula 3000 vehicle. Bruni was replaced with Formula Renault 2.0 UK Championship driver Heikki Kovalainen.

Practice and qualifying
There were two one-hour practice sessions preceding the race on Sunday: one on Thursday morning and one on Friday morning. In the first practice session, held on a dirty track because of debris left during practice for the Guia Race of Macau and in cool, cloudy weather, Paolo Montin lapped fastest for TOM'S at 2 minutes, 14.510 seconds set in the final minute. He was nearly four-tenths of a second faster than Jonathan Cochet in second who had front braking problems and was fastest until Montin's lap. The rest of the top ten were Sato, Pierre Kaffer, Tiago Monteiro, Yuji Ide, Kaneishi, João Paulo de Oliveira, Kosuke Matsuura and Tréluyer. No major incidents were reported during the session although Mark Taylor and Kovalainen scraped the trackside barriers.

Qualifying was divided into two 45-minute sessions; the first was held on Thursday afternoon, and the second on Friday afternoon. The fastest time set by each driver from either session counted towards their final starting position for Sunday's race. The first qualifying session on Thursday afternoon was held in warm weather and in a strong sea breeze from Macau's coastline. Practice pace setter Montin contended from the beginning and took provisional pole position with a 2 minutes, 13.214 seconds lap with less than two minutes left. Sato in second led for much of the session as Cochet went third-quickest. Monteiro had the pole position early on but he could not improve his time and took fourth. Anthony Davidson sought to find a rhythm he liked and was fifth. Sixth-placed Kaneshi took first from Monteiro until he fell back. Fukuka did not push too hard and he was provisionally seventh. Andy Priaulx was an early pace setter but he ended eighth. Tréluyer and Matsurra rounded out the top ten. De Oliviera was the fastest driver not to reach the top ten despite a strong pace early on. Kaffer was next ahead of Björn Wirdheim, Enrico Toccacelo and Derek Hayes. The rest of the order was completed by Marchy Lee, Kovalainen, Bruce Jouanny, Tristan Gommendy, Sakon Yamamoto, Peter Sundberg, Hackett, Ho, Haruki Kurosawa, Lei, Merszei, Matteo Bobbi and Taylor. Ide and Raffaele Giammaria did not set a lap time.

Ide slid on his out-lap and hit the Mandarin Oriental Bend wall. He recovered but stopped in the Melco hairpin tyre barrier, creating a traffic jam that caught out Giammaria. This stopped qualifying to allow marshals to clear the wreckage. Davidson could not avoid striking Lei's stricken car and went airborne. His suspension wishbones were broken and his nose cone removed. Davidson drove slowly to the pit lane for car repairs. Later, Kurosawa removed one of his car's wheels in an impact with a wall. Taylor and Bobbi made contact and ended their session early as Yamamoto heavily hit the wall alongside the track. With less than a minute left, Davidson lost rear vehicle traction at Matsuya bend and hit the barrier heavily. He ricocheted sideways across the track and stopped broadside. An unsighted Montiero then rammed Davidson's car at low speed. Davidson prepared by moving his head forwards and exited his car without external assistance. He complained of a sore neck and was taken by ambulance to the local hospital for a precautionary x-ray. He was kept in hospital overnight and ruled unfit to drive the rest of the meeting because of a concussion, torn neck ligaments and a fractured C5 vertebrae.

In the second half an hour practice session, which took place in hot and clear weather on Friday morning, Priaulx was the early pace setter and he held the top spot until Wirdheim set the first lap under 2-minute, 15 seconds. The order in the time sheets continuously changed but practice's opening minutes did not have anyone record a lap lower than two-minute and 14 seconds. Monteiro adjusted his car's set-up to go fastest with a 2 minutes, 13.241 seconds lap. He was 0.112 seconds faster than the second-placed Sato who was quick throughout due to a car set-up change. Tréluyer in third damaged his car's front in a mid-session impact with the wall, Cochet was fourth and Kaffer fifth. Fukuda, Wirdheim, de Oliviera, Toccacelo, and Priaulx were in positions six to ten.

The second 45-minute qualifying session on Friday afternoon was held in clear, hot and breezy weather. Provisional pole sitter Montin led early with the first lap to go below 2 minutes and 13 seconds. Wirdheim prepared by inspecting and filming 20 laps of the Guia Circuit on a VHS tape in a hire car with his race engineer early on Tuesday morning. He attributed this to aiding his efforts to take pole position from Montin but Tréluyer took it soon after. Fukuda then set a new fastest lap before the session was stopped when Hackett crashed into the wall and his car was recovered by track marshals. Wirdheim, Tréluyer and Cochet exchanged the pole position before Wirdheim secured it with a 2 minutes, 11.983 seconds lap, which the motorsport press considered surprising.

Sato was ninth in the final ten minutes and he improved to join Wirdheim on the grid's front row but did not earn the pole position because he swerved to avoid hitting Ho's car at the exit to Fisherman's Bend corner. Cochet could not respond to Wirdheim and Sato's pace and he remained third. Montin fell to fourth because he could not regain the necessary speed to return to the top three. He was marginally in front of Tréluyer in fifth. Priaulx improved to sixth in second qualifying's last minute. Matsuura moved to seventh while Monteiro was demoted to eighth and Fukuda fell to ninth. Kaffer completed the top ten qualifiers. Behind him the rest of the field lined up as Kaneishi, Ide, Toccacelo, Hayes, Jouanny, de Oliviera, Sundberg, Taylor, Gommendy, Kurosawa, Lee, Kovalainen, Giammaria, Yamamoto, Bobbi, Ho, Hackett, Lei and Merszei.

Qualifying classification
Each of the driver's fastest lap times from the two qualifying sessions are denoted in bold.

  – Anthony Davidson crashed heavily during the first qualifying session and he was declared medically unfit to take part in the race.

Warm-up

A half an hour warm-up session was held on the morning of the race. Montin recorded the fastest time of 2 minutes, 12.836 seconds. Sato's best lap was almost four-tenths of a second slower in second. Positions three to ten were occupied by pole sitter Wirdheim, Fukuda, Priaulx, Cochet, de Oliviera, Kaffer and the Japanese pair of Kaneishi and Matsuura.

Race
Sunday's race was divided into two aggregate legs lasting a total of 30 laps. The first 15-lap leg was held in the morning and the results of that leg determined the starting order of the second with the winner starting from pole position. Afterwards, a five-hour interval was observed to allow for the intervening support races to occur. The second 15-lap leg took place later in the afternoon. The overall winner of the Grand Prix was the driver who won the second leg provided they had completed all 30 laps in the shortest possible time.

Leg 1

The first leg of the race began in hot and sunny weather at 10:15 Macau Standard Time (UTC+08:00) on 18 November. Matsuura failed to get start and was instructed to begin from the pit lane. Wirdheim and Sato made equally fast start but neither driver led on the approach to Lisboa corner as Cochet glimpsed open space and executed a slingshot pass to take the lead. Further down the order, two multi-car accidents caused the leg to be red flagged to a halt. Hayes slipstreamed the rear of Jouanny's car on the straight going into Lisboa turn and felt a sudden spike of acceleration as he was about to be circumspect. He then locked his brakes, was launched over the top of Jouanny and landed on Kaffer's car. Some drivers made contact with each other as they scrambled for open space to try to avoid being caught up in the incident. Yamamoto was greatly unsettled and he ran off at San Francisco Bend. This caused Giammaria to drive off the track in avoidance and he hit the barrier beside the track. In all, eleven cars sustained damage in both crashes and de Oliviera, Kaneishi, Sundberg, Lee and Gommendy retired.

The race restarted with a standing start and Sato made a better getaway to slipstream past Wirdheim on the run to Lisboa corner for the lead. Cochet, meanwhile, could not achieve a fast start and he was left to battle Montin and Tréluyer. That gave Wirdheim the freedom to concentrate on staying with Sato if possible as Cochet lost the duel and fell to sixth. Priaulx picked up a puncture and entered the pit lane for new tyres to go several laps down. Sato drew clear from the rest of the field and led Wirdheim by one second. In the meantime, Monteiro and Toccacelo collided, causing the latter to retire and the former to drive slowly back to the pit lane for a replacement front wing. Elsewhere, Taylor went from nineteenth to eighth by the conclusion of the third lap while Kovalainen gained 13 positions to run in tenth by the same time. Montin overtook Tréluyer for third but Tréluyer stayed close behind him. Similarly, Sato could not pull away from Wirdheim who set a new fastest lap to close up to him.

The safety car was deployed on lap four when Cochet spun at the Reservoir bend and hit the tyre wall. Fukuda collected him and sustained heavy damage to his car's left-hand side. Although Fukuda exited his car without external aid, he sustained a concussion and was transported by ambulance to the local hospital. Four laps later, the safety car was withdrawn and the field was released back to racing speeds. However, it was immediately deployed for a second time when Taylor pushed too hard on cold tyres and lost control of his car at the Reservoir bend. He collided with the wall and removed a wheel which Hackett struck. Racing resumed on the ninth lap as the safety car was withdrawn. The race turned into a procession as all drivers sought to avoid an unpleasant situation. Sato was unchallenged in the final six laps to win the first leg and start the second from pole position. Wirdheim was 1.490 seconds behind in second and Montin completed the podium in third. Off the podium, Tréluyer gained on Montin but then settled for fourth. Matsuura finished fifth and Bobbi sixth. Ide finished seventh, Kovalainen eighth, Ho was the highest-placed Macanese driver in ninth and Hackett tenth. Outside the top ten, Lei finished 11th, having gained 18 positions from where he started. The trio of Merszei, Monteiro and Gommendy were the final classified finishers and Sato lapped the latter two twice.

Leg 2

The second leg started later that day in hot and sunny weather at 15:40 local time. Taylor, Cochet, Fukuda, Sundberg, Giammaria and Yamamoto could not start because their cars were damaged beyond repair, reducing the field to 23 drivers. The driver's major issue in the middle of the grid was that they would be easily overtaken by faster vehicles, which prompted Lei to allow them past so he would not interfere. At the start, Sato made a good getaway and withstood heavy pressure from Montin to retain his lead on the run to the first corner despite a glance with the barrier lining the circuit. Wirdheim had multiple cars beside him and he was passed by Tréluyer for second. Kovalainen could not accelerate off his grid slot and fell three-quarters of a lap adrift of Sato. While Sato pushed hard to establish his lead of 1.4 seconds by the end of lap one, Wirdheim put Tréluyer under pressure in the battle for second. Further back in the field, Bobbi was overtaken by Ide and Ho lost several positions to all drivers behind him bar Kovalainen and Lee. On lap two, Montin removed his rear-left wheel in a collision with the wall. He drove slowly to the pit lane for a replacement wheel and the subsequent loss of time put him out of contention for a top ten overall finish.

Sato's lead was lowered slightly as Tréluyer pulled away from Wirdheim in third. Sato responded by increasing his lead by a small margin the following lap and did the same whenever it appeared that Tréluyer would close up to him. Hayes endeavoured to make up for the first leg by eclipsing Narain Karthikeyan's race track lap record of the Guia Circuit in the 2000 edition at 2 minutes, 12.921 seconds. He caught Kurosawa and overtook him with no hindrance and then focused on catching Hackett whom he passed soon after. Hackett lost further positions to Kaneishi and de Oliviera by the conclusion of the seventh lap as they sought to recover lost ground from not restarting the first leg. Monteiro led a battle over fifth that included Priaulx, Kaffer and Ide, who blocked Monteiro from passing him and Priaulx overtook Monteiro. That meant Kaffer challenged Monteiro for sixth as Ide lost fifth to Priaulx on lap 12. Doing this unsettled Ide whom was overtaken by Monteiro and Kaffer and fell to eighth soon after because he delayed them for four laps. Ahead of the quartet, Matsuura was distanced by Wirdheim who began to challenge Tréluyer in slower traffic.

That distracted Tréluyer long enough to allow Wirdheim to attempt an overtake, which was blocked by the former. Jouanny and Hayes passed Bobbi on the road during the final lap. Meanwhile, on his second appearance in Macau, Sato was unchallenged for the rest of the second leg to complete it ten minutes faster than the first and win outright, achieving the first victory for a Japanese driver in the race's history. Tréluyer followed 4.410 seconds later in second and Wirdheim completed the overall podium finishers in third. Off the podium, the Japanese duo of Matsuura and Ide finished fourth and fifth. Bobbi took sixth and Hackett was seventh. Kovalainen was eighth, and the Macanese pair of Ho and Lei rounded out the top ten. The final classified finishers were Montin, Merszei, Monteiro, Gommendy and Kurosawa.

Race classification

References

External links
  (Archived)

Macau Grand Prix
2001 in Formula Three
Grand
Macau